Murder Uncovered is an Australian true-crime series that first screened on the Seven Network on 8 February 2017 hosted by Michael Usher. This investigative series reopens infamous cases of killings and crimes in Australian criminal history.

Broadcast
The third episode of Murder Uncovered, titled "Two Weddings and 29 Funerals", was scheduled to be aired on 22 February 2017, but was indefinitely pulled due to legal reasons. The timeslot intended for the episode was instead used to broadcast a short message by Michael Usher explaining the schedule change, followed by an episode of Bride & Prejudice. It was later rescheduled to air on 20 March, but was rescheduled again to air on Monday, 27 March. The reason for the broadcast block was reported by Fairfax Media to be due to a judge in the Victorian Supreme Court requesting the Seven Network to co-operate for fear it might prejudice jurors in the then-ongoing trial of Stephen Asling, charged with murdering Graham "The Munster" Kinniburgh in 2003.

Episodes

See also
 List of Australian television series
 Crime in Australia

References

Seven Network original programming
Australian non-fiction television series
2010s Australian crime television series
2017 Australian television series debuts
2017 Australian television series endings